Knowles Memorial Chapel, built between 1931 and 1932, is an historic Mediterranean Revival building located on the campus of Rollins College in Winter Park, Florida, in the United States. On December 8, 1997, it was added to the National Register of Historic Places. On April 18, 2012, the AIA's Florida Chapter placed the Knowles Chapel at Rollins College  on its list of Florida Architecture: 100 Years. 100 Places.

History
Knowles Memorial Chapel was given to Rollins College  by Frances Knowles Warren in memory of her father, Francis Bangs Knowles (1823–1890), one of the founders of both Rollins College and the city of Winter Park. It was designed by noted church and collegiate architect, Ralph Adams Cram, who considered it his favorite of the more than 75 churches and cathedrals he had designed. In the summer of 2007 it underwent a masonry restoration paid for by a trust set up by Frances Knowles Warren.

Organ
The chapel organ was built in 1932 by noted organ builder, Ernest M. Skinner. In the mid 1950s it was renovated by Skinner's firm,  Aeolian-Skinner. Between 1999 and 2002 the organ was completely overhauled and renovated by  Randall Dyer & Associates. At the same time the Dyer firm also built and installed a "completely new, free-standing antiphonal organ at the rear of the balcony and surrounding the Rose Window." Deeply involved in the work by the Dyer firm was its associate, John J. Tyrrell, former president of Aeolian-Skinner.

Stained Glass 
The rose window at the rear depicts the seven liberal arts and is a collaboration between Cram and stained-glass artist William Herbert Burnham.

Current use
Knowles Memorial Chapel continues to be used as the Rollins College Chapel and its dean is the pastor of the college. The chapel is also the venue for many  musical events, especially during the annual Bach Festival of Winter Park.

See also
 List of Registered Historic Places in Orange County, Florida

Gallery

References

External links

Knowles Memorial Chapel homepage
Knowles Memorial Chapel organ
Knowles Memorial Chapel history
Time magazine July 10, 1933
Florida's Office of Cultural and Historical Programs listing for Knowles Memorial Chapel
Rollins College's 2007 renovation of Knowles Memorial Chapel

National Register of Historic Places in Orange County, Florida
Properties of religious function on the National Register of Historic Places in Florida
Churches in Orange County, Florida
Rollins College
Buildings and structures in Winter Park, Florida
Ralph Adams Cram church buildings
University and college chapels in the United States
Historic American Buildings Survey in Florida
1932 establishments in Florida